Ashes to Ashes is a crime/thriller novel written by Tami Hoag. It is the first novel in the Kovac/Liska Series.

Plot introduction
A serial killer known as "The Cremator" is killing prostitutes in Minneapolis parks and setting their bodies on fire. When one of his victims turns out to be the daughter of a local billionaire, and a homeless teenager claims to have witnessed the burning, it brings together former FBI agent Kate Conlan (now working as a victim-witness advocate) and the Bureau's top serial-killer profiler, John Quinn. Conlan and Quinn share a painful personal history; now they have to work together against a very smart lunatic who seems to be able to read their minds.

External links
Tami Hoag's official website

Novels by Tami Hoag
1999 American novels
American thriller novels
American crime novels
Novels set in Minneapolis